Disconvenience was a punk band from Umeå in northern Sweden.

They were scheduled to tour Asia in late 2007.

In 2007, after the breakup of Disconvenience, Rickard and Emma formed the new band Epidemics with Erik Gunnarsson and Patrik Lindmark from the hardcore band The Rats.

Members
 Emma Swanström (bass guitar + vocals)
 Viktor Hariz (drums)
 Rickard Lundberg (guitar)

Former members:
 Nina Lundberg: (drums + backing vocals)

Discography
War on Wankers EP 2005
Umeå Punk City LP/CD 2006

References

External links
 

Swedish punk rock groups